Major General Edmund Alfred Drake-Brockman,  (21 February 1884 – 1 June 1949) was an Australian soldier, politician, and judge. He served in both the First and Second World Wars. He was a Senator for Western Australia from 1920 to 1926, representing the Nationalist Party, and later served as a judge of the Commonwealth Court of Conciliation and Arbitration from 1927 until his death in 1949.

Early life
Born in Busselton, Western Australia, Drake-Brockman was the son of surveyor Frederick Slade Drake-Brockman and heroine Grace Vernon Bussell and brother of Deborah Vernon Hackett. He was a 1902 graduate of the Guildford Grammar School. Interested in the military, he joined the Citizen Military Forces as a volunteer in 1903. He combined this with a career in law, becoming a barrister and solicitor in 1909, practicing in Perth.

First World War
Following the outbreak of the First World War, he volunteered for overseas service and served in the Gallipoli Campaign as a major while assigned to the 11th Battalion. He was made a Companion of the Order of St Michael and St George (CMG) for his services at Gallipoli. Later in the war, he was promoted to lieutenant colonel and commanded another Western Australian infantry battalion, the 16th, serving on the Western Front. In 1918, he was promoted to brigadier general and commanded the 4th Brigade.

Politics
Drake-Brockman was elected to the Senate at the 1919 federal election, one of a number of former AIF commanders elected as Nationalists. He became a "loyal government supporter". In 1923, when parliament reconvened after the 1922 election, he was appointed as government whip.

In parliament, Drake-Brockman spoke frequently on defence issues. He supported the government's Defence Bill 1921 which would have applied the United Kingdom's Army Act to the Australian military, and warned of Japanese aggression in the Pacific in the context of "the preservation of a White Australia". On trade policy, he "argued that the protective tariff disadvantaged the primary producing Western Australians" and opposed the government's establishment of the Tariff Board. Drake-Brockman was a member of several select committees, including that which recommended that the government commission Amalgamated Wireless (Australasia) to develop an overseas radio communication service. In 1925 he represented Australia at the League of Nations Assembly in Geneva.

In 1924, Drake-Brockman was elected president of the Central Council of Australian Employers, an employers' federation, succeeding George Fairbairn. At the annual convention later in the year, he "urged the employers to strenuously resist the rising tide of socialism" and advocated a return to piece work rather than wages.

Drake-Brockman did not recontest the 1925 federal election, in order to allow the Nationalists to put forward a joint ticket with their coalition partners the Country Party. He was the most junior of the three Nationalist senators in Western Australia up for re-election. His term expired in June 1926.

Judicial career and later life

In April 1927, Drake-Brockman was appointed to the Commonwealth Court of Conciliation and Arbitration. 

Still in the Citizen Military Forces, he was called up for duty during the Second World War, and commanded the 3rd Division, a militia formation, until 1942. He died on 1 June 1949, and was survived the three children he had by his wife, Constance, whom he had married in April 1912.

References
Citations

Bibliography

Mallett, Ross, Major General Edmund Drake-Brockman, General Officers of the First AIF, adfa.edu.au
Obituary, Obituaries Australia, National Centre of Biography, Australian National University

1884 births
1949 deaths
Military personnel from Western Australia
20th-century Australian politicians
Australian Companions of the Distinguished Service Order
Australian Companions of the Order of St Michael and St George
Australian Companions of the Order of the Bath
Australian generals
Australian military personnel of World War I
Australian Army personnel of World War II
Drake-Brockman family
Members of the Australian Senate for Western Australia
Nationalist Party of Australia members of the Parliament of Australia
People from Busselton